Norwegian County Road 63 ( or ) is a Norwegian county road in Møre og Romsdal county and a very small part in Innlandet county, Norway. It begins at Norwegian National Road 15 along the lake Langvatnet in Skjåk Municipality in Innlandet county and it heads north where it ends at the junction with the European route E136 highway near the town of Åndalsnes in Rauma Municipality, Møre og Romsdal county. The route runs for  including a single ferry crossing over the Norddalsfjorden. The vast majority of the road is in Møre og Romsdal county, only the southernmost  lie in the extreme western part of Innlandet county. Both the Langvatnet–Geiranger and Trollstigen sections of the road are closed during winter and spring (usually early November to late May) due to the weather conditions (snow and avalanches). The road passes by a number of notable landmarks, which has led to the earmarking of the route as national tourist route.

Path (from south to north)
From Langvatnet in the south the road passes the lake of Djupvatnet. From here, the mountain of Dalsnibba can be approached via a minor road. The road descends through a series of hairpin turns northwards towards the village of Geiranger, offering views of the Geirangerfjord in the process.

At Eidsdal, a ferry is required in order to cross the Norddalsfjorden. The ferry connects Eidsdal with Linge, from where the road passes through a number of small settlements, including Sylte, before running through the valleys of Valldalen and Meiadalen.

The northernmost section of the road includes the Trollstigen ("The Troll Footpath"), a further series of hairpin turns which descend a particularly steep mountain. From the Trollstigen the road runs in an approximate north-west direction before terminating at the junction with the E136 highway near Åndalsnes.

Diagram

Skjåk Municipality, Innlandet county
 ←Stryn, →Bismo
 Langvatnet — Road closure point in the winter

Stranda Municipality, Møre og Romsdal county
Djupvatnet, highest point on the road
 Geirangervegen (hairpin road)
Djupvasshytta; road up to Dalsnibba
Kvandall Bridge
 Opplenskedalen — Road closure point in the winter
Hole Bridge
Flå Bridge
 Ferry from Geiranger til Hellesylt (May 1 to September 30, 8 trips per day)
Geiranger village
 Ørnevegen hairpin turns
Oppskreds Tunnel

Fjord Municipality
Eidsdalselva Bridge
Eidsdal village
 →Norddal
Ferry from Eidsdal to Linge over the Norddalsfjorden (10 minutes, 3 trips per hour)
 ←Sjøholt 
Muri Bridge
Ferry from Sylte to Geiranger (June 15 until August 15, 2 trips per day) discontinued 2015
 →Tafjord
Sylte village
 →Døving
Uri Bridge
Hols Bridge
 →Døving
Gudbrandsjuvet Bridge
 Langdalen — Road closure point in the winter

Rauma Municipality
Stigfossen Bridge
Trollstigen hairpin turns
Kverna Bridge
 Hanekamhaug — Road closure point in the winter
 ←Veblungsnes
Sogge Bridge
 ←Åndalsnes, →Dombås

References

External links

 
063
063
063
Skjåk
Fjord (municipality)
Stranda
Rauma, Norway
National Tourist Routes in Norway